Adam Thomas Kennedy (born January 10, 1976) is an American former professional baseball second baseman. He played in Major League Baseball (MLB) for the St. Louis Cardinals, Oakland Athletics, Los Angeles Angels of Anaheim, Washington Nationals, Seattle Mariners, and Los Angeles Dodgers.

Early years
Kennedy was born in Riverside, California.  He attended John W. North High School in Riverside, playing baseball and basketball. He is the son of Tom Kennedy, who teaches Health at North High School.

He attended Cal State Northridge, where he played shortstop for the Matador baseball squad. He set school records in career hits, RBI and batting average and was a three-time All-American. He led the nation in hits as a sophomore and junior. In 1996, he played collegiate summer baseball with the Falmouth Commodores of the Cape Cod Baseball League.

Playing career

St. Louis Cardinals
Kennedy was drafted in the first round (20th overall) by the St. Louis Cardinals in the 1997 MLB draft. In 1999 with the Memphis Redbirds he hit .327 with 10 home runs and 63 RBI. He was selected as a Pacific Coast League All-Star, Baseball America first-team Minor League All-Star and Triple-A All-Star

He made his MLB debut on August 21, 1999, for the Cardinals against the New York Mets at second base. He was hitless in four at-bats in that game. His first MLB hit was a three RBI double to left field on August 22 off of Orel Hershiser of the Mets. His first MLB home run came on August 31 against Brian Meadows of the Florida Marlins. He appeared in 33 games for the Cards with a .255 batting average that season.

Anaheim Angels/Los Angeles Angels of Anaheim
Kennedy was traded the following year to the Anaheim Angels with Kent Bottenfield for Jim Edmonds.

Kennedy matched a team record with eight RBI against the Blue Jays on April 18, 2000.  It was the most RBI by any rookie in one game since Fred Lynn drove in 10 for the Boston Red Sox in 1975.

In Game 5 of the 2002 American League Championship Series against the Minnesota Twins, Kennedy hit three home runs, joining only  nine other players who hit three homers in a post-season game: Babe Ruth, Bob Robertson, Reggie Jackson, George Brett, Adrián Beltré, Albert Pujols, Pablo Sandoval, José Altuve, and Enrique Hernández. Kennedy's performance helped the Angels clinch the American League pennant, and Kennedy was named the series' Most Valuable Player. The Angels went on to beat the San Francisco Giants in seven games in the World Series, earning Kennedy a World Series ring.

The 2002 campaign established Kennedy as a fixture in the Angels infield. However, his declining offensive performance put his status with the club in flux.  Before the 2006 season trade deadline, it was rumored that Kennedy would be traded, most notably for Shea Hillenbrand. While the rumors never came to fruition, Kennedy was forced to share the starting second base position, playing in a platoon with rookie Howie Kendrick for the remainder of the season.

The national spotlight shone briefly on Kennedy on August 16, 2006, when he took part in a bench-clearing brawl in the ninth inning of a game between the Texas Rangers and the Angels.  Tensions between the two division rivals were already high, as two Rangers starting pitchers — Adam Eaton and Vicente Padilla — had been ejected in previous games that month for throwing at Angels batters. Also, two Angels hurlers (Kevin Gregg and Brendan Donnelly) had already been thrown out of the game for hitting batters, and manager Mike Scioscia and bench coach Ron Roenicke had been ejected as well.  Rangers pitcher Scott Feldman hit Kennedy in the buttocks with a fastball with only one out remaining in the game, and his team up 9–3.  Kennedy charged the mound, triggering a fight between the 6' 5" Feldman and the 6' 1" Kennedy.  As Kennedy charged him, Feldman stood on the mound and threw down his glove, and when Kennedy reached him Feldman then hit Kennedy in the armpit with a punch.  Kennedy was suspended for four games for his actions.

In seven seasons with the Angels, Kennedy hit .280 in 992 games, with 51 home runs and 353 RBI.

Return to St. Louis
On November 28, 2006, he signed a 3-year, $10 million contract with his former team, the St. Louis Cardinals.

On August 11, 2007, Kennedy was placed on the 15-day disabled list with a torn medial meniscus in his right knee, an injury that would sideline him for the remainder of the season. He was in 87 games prior to the injury, and hit only .219.

In 2008, he played in 115 games and hit .280. On February 9, 2009, after a year of demanding a trade due to his unfulfilled desire for a starting role on the Cardinals, Kennedy was released by the team.

Tampa Bay Rays
He signed a minor league deal with the Tampa Bay Rays one week later. The Rays assigned him to the AAA Durham Bulls, his first minor league action since 2005. With the Bulls, he hit .280 in 23 games.

Oakland Athletics
On May 8, 2009, he was traded to the Oakland Athletics for Joe Dillon and was assigned to Triple-A Sacramento. His contract was purchased the next day. He appeared in 129 games for the Athletics, mostly at third base and second base, batting .289 with 11 home runs.

Washington Nationals
On February 12, 2010, Kennedy signed with the Washington Nationals. He played in 135 games for the Nationals, hitting .249. He mostly played second base, but also appeared in 51 games at first base, the first time he had seen any regular time at that position in his career.

Seattle Mariners
On January 10, 2011, he signed a minor-league deal with the Seattle Mariners. Kennedy, however, made the team out of spring training, and served as a utility infielder, seeing action at first base, second base and third base during the year while hitting .234 in 114 games. Midway through the season he replaced former Angels teammate Chone Figgins as the starting third baseman. He elected free agency on October 30.

Los Angeles Dodgers
On December 1, 2011, Kennedy signed a one-year contract with the Los Angeles Dodgers. In 86 games with the Dodgers, mostly as a pinch hitter (with occasional starts at second and third), Kennedy hit .262. A strained right groin put him on the disabled list and ended his season early, on September 11.

Post playing career
After his playing career ended, Kennedy opened up a new baseball academy.

See also

 List of California State University, Northridge people
 List of Major League Baseball career assists as a second baseman leaders
 List of Major League Baseball career games played as a second baseman leaders
 List of people from Riverside, California
 Los Angeles Angels award winners and league leaders

References

External links

1976 births
Living people
Albuquerque Isotopes players
American League Championship Series MVPs
Anaheim Angels players
Arkansas Travelers players
Baseball players at the 1999 Pan American Games
Baseball players from Riverside, California
Cal State Northridge Matadors baseball players
Durham Bulls players
Falmouth Commodores players
Los Angeles Angels players
Los Angeles Dodgers players
Major League Baseball second basemen
Memphis Redbirds players
New Jersey Cardinals players
Oakland Athletics players
Pan American Games medalists in baseball
Pan American Games silver medalists for the United States
Prince William Cannons players
Rancho Cucamonga Quakes players
Salt Lake Stingers players
Seattle Mariners players
St. Louis Cardinals players
United States national baseball team players
Washington Nationals players
Medalists at the 1999 Pan American Games
Alaska Goldpanners of Fairbanks players